The 1966–67 Gonzaga Bulldogs men's basketball team represented Gonzaga University during the 1966–67 NCAA University Division basketball season. In the fourth season of the Big Sky Conference, the Bulldogs were led by sixteenth-year head coach Hank Anderson and played their home games on campus at Kennedy Pavilion in Spokane, Washington.

Gonzaga repeated as co-champions of the Big Sky, this time with Montana State; the conference did not yet have an automatic berth to the 23-team NCAA tournament, which came the next year. The 14-team National Invitation Tournament (NIT) was not interested in either team, and without a post-season berth on the line, no playoff was held.

Senior center Gary Lechman led the Big Sky in points, field goal percentage, and rebounding, while Gonzaga led in the team statistics.

References

External links
Sports Reference – Gonzaga Bulldogs: 1966–67 basketball season

Gonzaga Bulldogs men's basketball seasons
Gonzaga